The 2015 Wildwater Canoeing World Championships was the 32nd edition of the global wildwater canoeing competition, Wildwater Canoeing World Championships, organised by the International Canoe Federation.

Results

Men

Kajak

Canadian

Women

Kajak

Canadian

See also
 Wildwater canoeing

References

External links
 

Wildwater Canoeing World Championships